In algebraic geometry, a White surface is one of the rational surfaces in Pn studied by , generalizing cubic surfaces and Bordiga surfaces, which are the cases n = 3 or 4.

A White surface in Pn is given by the embedding of P2 blown up in n(n + 1)/2 points by the linear system of degree n curves through these points.

References

Complex surfaces
Algebraic surfaces